Perry Joseph Green of Portland, Oregon was a philosopher and preacher of the New Thought Movement in the early 1900s.

Publications
Pre-natal and post-natal culture: for the development of the greatest possibilities in the on-coming generation, physiologically, psychologically and spiritually considered  (1916)

References

Year of death missing
Year of birth missing
New Thought clergy
New Thought writers
Clergy from Portland, Oregon